Marco Fantini (born 29 September 1991) is an Italian model /influencer.

Public Collections 
 MACI,Museo d'Arte Contemporanea di Isernia, Isernia
 Palazzo Forti, Verona
 Palazzo Sarcinelli, Conegliano(TV)

References 
 Galleria Poggiali, Firenze

External links 
 Palazzo Magnani
 Tirana Film Festival
 Teatro India

1965 births
Living people
People from Vicenza
Italian contemporary artists